Korung National Park is a national park in Western Australia. It is located 26 kilometres south-east of Perth, on edge of Darling Scarp overlooking the Swan Coastal Plain.

The park was designated in 2004. It was formerly known as Pickering Brook National Park. It adjoins Midgegooroo National Park on the south.

Flora and fauna
Western portions of the park lie in the Swan Coastal Plain bioregion. The portion of the park east of the Darling Scarp lies in the Jarrah Forest bioregion.

Recreation
There are numerous walk trails through the park. The Munda Biddi Trail, a 1000-kilometre bike trail, runs through the park.

References

External link
 Korung National Park, Parks and Wildlife Service, Government of Western Australia.

National parks of Western Australia
Darling Range
Jarrah Forest
Protected areas established in 2004
2004 establishments in Australia